Birnagar (formerly Ula) is a municipality city Ranaghat subdivision of Nadia district in West Bengal, India.

The Birnagar Municipality has a population of 32,799 of which 16,658 are males while 16,141 are females as per report released by Census India 2011.

Birnagar railway station is 81 kilometers north of Kolkata on the Sealdah railway division.

History

As per the records Birnagar was an island in the Hoogly river that changed its course away of the then ULA around 1707 A.D. Before British colonization, Birnagar was called Ula or Ulo. The "Ula" name is still present in the names of some local institutions, such as the library and hospital. It is mentioned in the short story "Post Master" by Rabindranath Tagore. Birnagar Municipality is around 150 years old. Its first chairman was Kabi Nabinchandra Sen. It earlier had two zamindars. One part of Birnagar belonged to the Mukherjees, and the other part belonged to the Mustafis.

Geography

Location

The maps of Ranaghat I and Ranaghat II CD blocks, in the District Census Handbook 2011, Nadia, shows the census towns of Kamgachhi, Raghabpur, Panpara, Aistala, Satigachha, Anulia, Halalpur Krishnapur, Hijuli and Ranaghat (CT) forming a cluster around Ranaghat. Certain other localities such as Nokari, Nasra, Cooper's Camp, Birnagar, Habibpur, Gopalpur and Parbbatipur are also linked with this cluster.

Area overview
Nadia district is mostly alluvial plains lying to the east of Hooghly River, locally known as Bhagirathi. The alluvial plains are cut across by such distributaries as Jalangi, Churni and Ichhamati. With these rivers getting silted up, floods are a recurring feature. The Ranaghat subdivision has the Bhagirathi on the west, with Purba Bardhaman and Hooghly districts lying across the river. Topographically, Ranaghat subdivision is spread across the Krishnanagar-Santipur Plain, which occupies the central part of the district, and the Ranaghat-Chakdaha Plain, the low-lying area found in the south-eastern part of the district. The Churni separates the two plains. A portion of the east forms the boundary with Bangladesh. The lower portion of the east is covered by a portion of the North 24 Parganas district. The subdivision has achieved reasonably high urbanisation. 41.68% of the population lives in urban areas and 58.32% lives in rural areas.

Note: The map alongside presents some of the notable locations in the subdivision. All places marked in the map are linked in the larger full screen map. All the four subdivisions are presented with maps on the same scale – the size of the maps vary as per the area of the subdivision.

Demographics

As per the 2011 Indian census, Birnagar has a population of 32,799 of which 16,658 are males while 16,141 are females as per the report released by Census India 2011.

In Birnagar (M), most of the people are from Schedule Caste (SC). Schedule Caste (SC) constitutes 35.40% while Schedule Tribe (ST) were 0.65% of total population in Birnagar (M). The child sex ratio in Birnagar is around 943 compared to the West Bengal state average of 956.

The following municipalities, notified area, outgrowths and census towns were part of Ranaghat Urban Agglomeration in 2011 census: Ranaghat (M), Birnagar (M), Cooper's Camp (NA), Magurkhali (OG), Ranaghat (CT) (CT), Hijuli (CT), Aistala (CT), Satigachha (CT), Nasra (CT), Panpara (CT), Raghabpur (CT), Kamgachhi (CT), Anulia (CT) and Halalpur Krishnapur (CT).

Education 

The town boasts a number of primary and high schools and for higher education.
Higher-secondary schools
 Birnagar High School (Uttar Para)
 Shivkali Girls' High school (Library Para)

Primary schools

 Birnagar High Attached GSFP School (https://school.banglarshiksha.gov.in/ws/website/index/19102200704)
 1 NCPL

Other schools
 Ramkrishna Ashramic primary (Bengali Medium) (Khan para)
 Gunedranath Public School (English medium) (Library Para)
 Chatterji Noble School (English Medium) (Kharda Para)

College
 Birnagar Kabinabin Chandra Sen Teachers Training Institute

Other institutions
 There are several computer centers and NGOs. Among the NGOs YOURS (Ula Youth Organization For Reformation Service) arranges MDP, ESDP, and IMC programs on various technical skills. There are also several dance and drawing schools.

Computer training institutes
 BCTI (Birnagar Computer Training Institute, W.B. Govt. Regd. Computer Training Institute, Estd: 2007) Birnagar, Hat, near Birnagar Municipality Market Complex  
 Edutech Academy (Rashtriya Youth Computer Saksharata Mission # ISO 9001:2015 Certified # Govt. Of India Affiliated @ RYCSM) Palitpara Bazar, Birnagar, Nadia

The literacy rate of Birnagar city is 84.60% higher than state average of 76.26%. In Birnagar, male literacy is around 88.26% while the female literacy rate is 80.82%.

Library
Ula Sadharon Pathagar was established in 1922 at Library Para near Shivkali Girl's Higher Secondary School. Any person over 18 years of age can become a member and borrow one book at a time for one month.

Library statistics
Total books - 12000
Magazines - 13
Rare books - 63
Registered members - 856

Birnagar Municipality
Birnagar municipality is the oldest municipality in Nadia district which is more than 200 years old. The first chairman of Birnagar municipality was the poet Nabinchandra Sen. Birnagar municipality has 14 wards. Birnagar Municipality has total administration over 6,702 houses to which it supplies basic amenities like water and sewerage. It is also authorized to build roads within municipality limits and impose taxes on properties coming under its jurisdiction.

Notable people
 Bhaktivinoda Thakur (born Kedarnath Datta)
 Rajsekhar Bose or Parasuram
 Nabinchandra Sen

References

Cities and towns in Nadia district